Buder is a German surname. Notable people with the surname include:

Andreas Buder (born 1979), Austrian alpine skier
Erich Buder (1896–1975), German World War I flying ace
Ernst Erich Buder (1896–1962), German composer
Karin Buder (born 1964), Austrian alpine skier
Madonna Buder (born 1930), American triathlete
Manfred Buder (1936–2021), German ice hockey player
Oliver-Sven Buder (born 1966), German shot putter
Johannes Buder (disambiguation)

German-language surnames